Rafida is a primarily pejorative term used to refer to Shīʿi Muslims. The term occurs commonly in the texts of hardline Sunni scholars, such as Ibn 'Abd al-Wahhab's "Risalah fi al-radd ala al-Rafidah" (Treatise/Letter on the Denial/Rejection Pertaining to the Rafidah). While the term alone might not indicate a denial of the Shi'a as Muslims, it has historically been used as reasonable grounds for accusation of excommunication (Takfir). 

Profound discourse exists among Sunni scholars in regard to how liberally the term Rāfiḍah can be applied to the Shīʿites in general.

Etymology 
The word Rafida is an Arabic word, literally meaning "rejectors". The word is derived from the Arabic consonantal root ر ف ض (r-f-ḍ), which as a verb means "to reject". The non-collective singular form is  rāfiḍī "one who rejects". 

The term stems from the idea that Shi'a Muslims (or, in some sources, only certain sects among the Shi'a) are those who reject (rafḍ) the caliphates of the first three Rashidun, namely Abu Bakr, Umar, and Uthman, in favour of the leadership of Ali. This succession crisis was the basis upon which the Sunni-Shi'a split initially occurred.

Origin

There is much debate of the exact origin of Rāfiḍa. One example of an early instance is from the Kitāb al-Maḥāsin of Abū Jaʿfar Aḥmad ibn Muḥammad al-Barqī (died: 887 CE). The fourth section of the Kitāb al-Maḥāsin has occasions of the use of Rāfiḍa ascribed to Shi'i Imams Ja'far al-Sadiq and Muhammad al-Baqir, such as:A sugarcane-vendor came to Ja'far al-Sadiq saying that someone had warned him against becoming a Rāfiḍi and Jaʿfar al-Ṣādiq replied: 'By Allah, this name which Allah has granted you is excellent, as long as you follow our teaching and do not attribute lies to us.'
Muḥammad al-Bāqir, in a similar circumstance, is described as having pointed at himself stating: 'I am one of the Rāfiḍa'

Mughira ibn Shu'ba is said to have coined the term Rāfiḍa against those who had rejected him.

Others refer to another historical text for its origin. Ja'far al-Sadiq believed that Rāfiḍa was an honorific given first by God and preserved in the Hebrew Bible and the New Testament: he mentioned that there were 70 men among the people of Pharaoh who rejected him and his ways and rather joined Moses, and God called those 70 men Rāfiḍa. They were referred to in the army of Moses as al-Rafida because they rejected the Pharaoh and were intense in their worship and their love for Moses, Aaron, and their offspring.

Al-Sadiq further states that Allah revealed to Moses, "Establish this name for them in the Torah, for I have named them with it and gifted it to them." He extends the usage of the word to include the Shi'a of the family of Muhammad.

However, the term Rāfiḍa does not appear anywhere in the Qur'an itself. Thus, it is speculated that he turned to the Bible in order to establish its validity. However, the story of the magicians who rejected the Pharaoh and joined Moses does not appear anywhere in the Bible either. Some argue that the story of the magicians was mentioned in the Original Texts, but their enemies later deleted it.

The term Rāfiḍa as a pejorative for Shi'a began early in the history of Islam, originating, according to one source, in the uprising of Zayd ibn Ali against the Umayyad Caliphate. In this instance, Rāfiḍa referred to those Kufans who deserted and refused to support Zayd, who had a policy not to condemn the first two Rashidun Caliphs, saying he never heard his family call them bad names. Zayd ibn Ali considered Ali the best leader after Muhammad, but refused to condemn the caliphate of Abu Bakr and Umar. As a result the majority of the Kufans deserted Zayd ibn Ali, hence the term Rāfiḍa due to their rejection.

The meaning of the term went through several changes over time. According to Zaydi sources, the term was used by Zayd ibn Ali against some Kufans was not because to their rejection of the Abu Bakr & Umar, but because of for their rejection of Zayd ibn Ali's claim to Imamate because they considered Ja'far al-Sadiq to be the Imam instead:
Allah is Most Great! I swear by Allah, you all are the Rafidites mentioned by the Messenger of Allah in his statement: 'After me there will be a people who will reject the jihad with the good of the Ahl al-Bayt and they will say that there is no commanding the good or forbidding the evil! They will mimic in the religion and follow their whims …'

Afterwards, including the time of the Abbasid Sunni leaders, "Rāfiḍa" became a popular pejorative term for the Twelvers - used by the Zaydiyya to recall their rejection of Zayd ibn Ali and by the Sunni to recall their rejection of the first two Sunni Rashidun, namely Abu Bakr and Umar.

The Twelvers believe that after the death of Muhammad, they were the only ones who rejected evil, making them the successors of the original Rāfiḍa.

Influential medieval Islamic scholar Ibn Taymiyyah was known to condemn Rāfiḍa as generally diabolical -- "the worst of those who follow desires, ignorance and oppression". Muhammad ibn Abd al-Wahhab, founder of the Wahhabi Movement and a devout follower of Ibn Taymiyyah, titled one of his books Al-Radd 'ala al-Rafidah (The Refutation of the Rejectionists), though it was claimed by Natana J. Delong-Bas in one of her works that Muhammad ibn Abd al-Wahhab was referring to an extremist sect of Shi'i Islam when talking about Rāfiḍa, not the Shi'a in general.

Usage
Rumi (Mawlana) in his Masnavi (Title of the Story in Book V, poem 844) refers to the inhabitants of Sabzawar (in present-day Afghanistan) as Rawafid (Rafidis) among whom one cannot find a person named Abu Bakr. This is from the earliest extant copy of the Masnavi, dated 677 H Gh (1279 Gregorian) which is considered the most reliable by, e.g., B. Forouzanfar and R.A. Nicholson.
 
The fourteenth-century Sunni traveler Ibn Battuta used it in his description of the Alawis, considered by many as a ghulat sect, during his visit to Syria in 1326. The term continues to be used in this way today. Rafida was also sometimes used to indicate extremists and ash-Shi'i for moderates.

At certain points, the Shi'i tried to reappropriate this derogatory term that was being used against them daily and make it convey positive connotations by referring to themselves as Rawafid since it gave them a sense of pride because the revolted against Umayyad tyranny. And although Shi'is sometimes designate themselves as Rawafid, it is also a derogatory term applied by the Sunnis to describe the Shi'is who refused to accept the early caliphates.

As defined by Ahmed Cevdet Pasha, the Shia first developed Kaysanism, which in turn divided into three major groupings known as Fivers, Seveners and Twelvers. The non-Zaydis are called "Rafida" by the Zaydis, when they were separated from the rest of the Shia.

Current
In Saudi Arabia today, Shias are referred to as Rafidha. In Iraq, anti-Shi'a material is still surfacing. A discourse was released after improvement by the name of "The Rafida in the Land of Tawhid", which included orders by a member of the Higher Council, to kill Shias.

Until 1993, schoolbooks in Saudi Arabia openly denounced the Shia Islam and referred to the Shi'as rafida in the books. The curriculum was changed after protests and rafida is no longer used in the text books; the Islamic Shi'a beliefs are still however denounced in the books.
In modern times, the term rafida is primarily used in Salafi jihadism such as ISIS to justify their execution of Shias.

In their ongoing campaign to unseat the government of Iraq and the government Syria, the Islamic State of Iraq and the Levant, as well Syrian opposition rebels frequently uses the term "rafidah" to refer to Shia Muslims. Alawaites, are referred to as 'Nusayri'.  In the 13th edition of the ISIS magazine Dabiq the feature article is entitled, The Rafidah: From Ibn Saba’ to the Dajjal and contains, "pages of violent rhetoric directed against Shiites" who it claims are, "more severely dangerous and more murderous...than the Americans".  The article justifies the killing of Shia, who Islamic State claim are murtaddin (apostates)

See also
Criticism of Twelver Shia Islam
Shia–Sunni relations
Succession to Muhammad
Takfir
Words to denote religious opponents
 Al-Azhar Shia Fatwa

References

External links
rafida.org
 "The Language of Anti-Shiism" by Fanar Haddad , Foreign Policy, August 9, 2013
"The Vocabulary of Sectarianism" by Aaron Y. Zelin and Phillip Smyth, Foreign Policy, January 29, 2014

Shia Islam
Shia–Sunni relations
Islam-related slurs
Arabic words and phrases
Anti-Shi'ism